Stefanie in Rio is a 1960 West German romantic comedy film directed by Curtis Bernhardt and starring Carlos Thompson, Sabine Sinjen and Andréa Parisy. It is a sequel to the 1958 film Stefanie.

It was shot at the Spandau and Tempelhof Studios and on location in Rio de Janeiro. The film's sets were designed by the art director Wolf Englert and Ernst Richter.

Cast
 Carlos Thompson as Pablo Guala
 Sabine Sinjen as Stefanie 'Steffie' Gonthar
 Andréa Parisy as Isabella Sampaio
 Françoise Rosay as Mutter Leonora Guala
 Peter Vogel as Andreas 'Andi' Gonthar
 Geronimo Meynier as Diego
 Rainer Penkert as Hannes Gonthar
 Carl Wery as Pfarrer Don Nicolo
 Herbert Weissbach as Zimmerkellner
 Ewald Wenck as Taxler

References

Bibliography
 Bock, Hans-Michael & Bergfelder, Tim. The Concise CineGraph. Encyclopedia of German Cinema. Berghahn Books, 2009.

External links 
 

1960 films
1960 romantic comedy films
German romantic comedy films
West German films
1960s German-language films
Films directed by Curtis Bernhardt
German sequel films
Films set in Rio de Janeiro (city)
Films shot at Tempelhof Studios
Films shot at Spandau Studios
UFA GmbH films
1960s German films